The Dotnuvėlė is a river of Kėdainiai district municipality and Radviliškis district municipality, Kaunas County, central Lithuania. It flows for 60.9 kilometres and has a basin area of 192.7 km2. It is a right tributary of the Nevėžis river.

Its valley is 350–500 m wide. The current rate is 0.2-0.9 meters per second. The Dotnuvelė course goes through Skėmiai, Gudžiūnai, Mantviliškis, Akademija, Dotnuva and meets the Nevėžis river in Kėdainiai.

References

Rivers of Lithuania
Kėdainiai District Municipality
Radviliškis District Municipality